Kavkaz is a rural locality (a village) in Chekmagushevsky District, Bashkortostan, Russia. The population was 9 as of 2010. There is 1 street.

Geography 
Kavkaz is located 18 km east of Chekmagush (the district's administrative centre) by road. Starokalmashevo is the nearest rural locality.

References 

Rural localities in Chekmagushevsky District